Amirani or Amiran is the name of a culture hero of a Georgian epic who resembles the Classical Prometheus. Various versions of the myth reveal a process through which the myth was transformed over time, but the legend itself is traced between 3,000 and 2,000 years BC at the beginning of the first Iron Age, as in the myth Demiurge
Amirani defies God by introducing to the human kind the use of metal, and just like Prometheus, he is punished and chained on Caucasus with his cursed dog Q'ursha. Similar to the Prometheus myth, an eagle eats his liver in the day, but it heals itself every night.

History
Amirani was the son of Dali, a Caucasian goddess of the hunt, but he was removed prematurely from her womb and raised by a hunter Sulkalmah and his wife Darejan, alongside the latter's two natural sons Badri and Usup. Together, they fought evil spirits and defeated a three-headed giant whose several heads metamorphosed into snakes.  Amirani battles with dragons. He is swallowed by the Black Dragon. Amirani cuts the dragon's belly and comes out.

While battling other evil spirits in his search for a bride, his two mortal brothers were killed, and Amirani attempted suicide, but discovered to his dismay that he returned to life. Thereafter, Amirani abandoned his search for a bride, and empowered by the highest God, Ghmerti (the Georgian word for God), he took on another giant, and then Ghmerti (or God) himself. In response for this insolence, God punished him in three stages: he fastened Amirani to a post driven deep in the earth; second, he buried him in chains under a mountain pass, which formed a cave-like dome over him; and third, for one night each year, the mountain opened to reveal Amirani suspended in air where a human attempted in vain to release him, and the mountain closed again.

In some parts of Caucasian Iberia, the alternative account as reflected in the Greek myth, in which the hero is attacked daily by an eagle sent by the deity, was for a long time commemorated by the destruction of eagles nests, as the enemies of Amirani. The Svan (from the Kingdom of Georgia) version of the myth represents Amirani's story most precisely and clearly .

See also
Georgian mythology
Amiran-Darejaniani

References

 
 
 
 Shorena Kurtsikidze & Vakhtang Chikovani, Ethnography and Folklore of the Georgia-Chechnya Border: Images, Customs, Myths & Folk Tales of the Peripheries, Munich: Lincom Europa, 2008.
 

Georgian mythology
Georgian words and phrases